
Gmina Wielka Wieś is a rural gmina (administrative district) in Kraków County, Lesser Poland Voivodeship, in southern Poland.

The gmina contains part of the protected area called Kraków Valleys Landscape Park.

Villages
Gmina Wielka Wieś contains the villages and settlements of Bębło, Będkowice, Biały Kościół, Czajowice, Giebułtów, Modlnica, Modlniczka, Prądnik Korzkiewski, Szyce, Tomaszowice, Wielka Wieś and Wierzchowie.

Neighbouring gminas
Gmina Wielka Wieś is bordered by the city of Kraków and by the gminas of Jerzmanowice-Przeginia, Skała, Zabierzów and Zielonki.

References
Polish official population figures 2006

Wielka Wies
Kraków County